Aerochaco was an airline based in Resistencia, Chaco, Argentina.

Destinations
Aerochaco operated the following service:

Córdoba - Ingeniero Ambrosio L.V. Taravella International Airport
San Juan - Domingo Faustino Sarmiento Airport 
Sunchales - Sunchales Airport
Villa María - Presidente Nestor Kirchner Airport

Fleet
The Aerochaco fleet includes the following aircraft:

References

External links
Aerochaco Fleet

Defunct airlines of Argentina
Airlines established in 2008
Airlines disestablished in 2013
Argentine companies established in 2008